WR 42e (2MASS J11144550-115001) is a Wolf–Rayet star in the massive H II region NGC 3603 in the constellation of the Carina. It is around 25,000 light-years or 7,600 parsec from the Sun. WR 42e is one of the most massive and most luminous stars known.

WR 42e was first catalogued in 2004 as a member of NGC 3603, numbered 954. It was noted as having x-ray and Hα emission. A detailed study published in 2012 showed that the faint red star was actually a highly obscured (6.4 magnitudes in the visual) hot blue Wolf Rayet star and gave it the name WR 42e. Subsequent changes to the naming conventions for new galactic Wolf–Rayet stars mean it is also called WR 42-1.

WR 42e is located 2.7 arcmin west-northwest of the massive open cluster HD 97950 at the heart of NGC 3603, corresponding to 6 parsecs at the distance of NGC 3603. This is outside the compact core of the cluster where similar massive luminous stars are found. It is speculated that WR 42e was ejected in an unusual three-body encounter possibly involving the merger of two of the stars and the ejection of both the resulting objects.

The spectrum of WR 42e shows many characteristics of an OIf* star, such as hydrogen Balmer series absorption lines and emission lines of ionised nitrogen and helium. The relative strengths of the nitrogen emission lines and the lack of absorption in the  helium line indicate a spectral class of O3 If*. However, the Hβ line shows a distinct emission wing. A P Cygni profile for this line is a defining character of the OIf*/WN class and so WR 42e is assigned the type O3If*/WN6.

See also
Initial mass function

References

Carina (constellation)
Wolf–Rayet stars
J11144550-115001
O-type supergiants
NGC 3603